The Roman Catholic Diocese of Banjarmasin is a diocese located in the city of Banjarmasin in the Ecclesiastical province of Samarinda in Indonesia.

History
 May 21, 1938: Established as Apostolic Prefecture of Bandjarmasin from the Apostolic Vicariate of Dutch Borneo
 March 10, 1949: Promoted as Apostolic Vicariate of Bandjarmasin
 January 3, 1961: Promoted as Diocese of Bandjarmasin
 August 22, 1973: Renamed as Diocese of Banjarmasin

Leadership
 Bishops of Banjarmasin (Roman rite)
 Bishop Petrus Boddeng Timang (June 14, 2008 – present)
 Bishop Franciscus Xaverius Rocharjanta Prajasuta, M.S.F. (June 6, 1983 – June 14, 2008)
 Bishop Wilhelmus Demarteau, M.S.F. (January 3, 1961 – June 6, 1983)
 Vicars Apostolic of Bandjarmasin (Roman Rite) 
 Bishop Wilhelmus Demarteau, M.S.F. (January 6, 1954 – January 3, 1961)
 Bishop Giovanni Groen, M.S.F. (March 10, 1949 – April 18, 1953)
 Prefects Apostolic of Bandjarmasin (Roman Rite) 
 Fr. Giacomo Giovanni M. Kusters, M.S.F. (May 21, 1938 – 1949)

References
 GCatholic.org
 Catholic Hierarchy
 Sulawesi Priest Named To Head Diocese In Kalimantan

Banjarmasin
Roman Catholic dioceses in Indonesia
Christian organizations established in 1938
Roman Catholic dioceses and prelatures established in the 20th century
1938 establishments in the Dutch East Indies